ADATA Technology Co., Ltd. is a Taiwanese fabless memory, storage and computer case manufacturer, founded in May 2001 by Simon Chen. Its main product line consists of DRAM modules, USB Flash drives,  hard disk drives, solid state drives, memory cards and mobile accessories. ADATA is also expanding into new areas, including robotics and electric powertrain systems. In addition to its main ADATA brand, the company also sells PC gaming hardware and accessories under its XPG ("Xtreme Performance Gear") brand.

In 2017 ADATA was the second-largest DRAM module manufacturer in the world and had a market capitalization of US$680 million. In recent years ADATA has extended its business to Europe and the Americas, while competing strongly with Samsung in Asia.

Product lines 

Consumer
 DRAM Modules for desktop and notebook PCs
 Solid State Drives
 External Storage (HDD, SSD, Enclosures)
 USB Flash Drives
 Memory Cards / Readers
 Power Banks 
 Car / Wireless / USB Chargers
 USB / Micro USB / Lightning Cables 
 Media Adapters

XPG (Gaming)
 Solid State Drives
 Memory
 External Storage (SSD)
 Gaming Accessories (Mouse, Mousepad, Keyboard, Headset)
Desktop and Laptop Computers

Industrial
 Solid State Drives / Flash Storage
 Card / UFD / Embedded
DRAM Modules

Lighting
 Home Lighting
 Industrial / Commercial Lighting
 Smart Lighting 
 Lighting for Outdoor Activities

Powertrain
 Two-Wheels
 Tri-Wheels
 Industrial

See also
 List of companies of Taiwan

References

Links

ADATA (Consumer)
ADATA Industrial Solutions 
ADATA Lighting (Traditional Chinese)
ADATA Powertrain (Traditional Chinese)
XPG (Gaming)

Computer memory companies
Computer peripheral companies
Computer storage companies
Electronics companies of Taiwan
Computer companies established in 2001
Taiwanese brands
Taiwanese companies established in 2001
Computer enclosure companies
Companies listed on the Taipei Exchange
2004 initial public offerings